The following highways are numbered 297:

Canada
 Quebec Route 297

Japan
 Japan National Route 297

United States
  Interstate 297 (unbuilt)
  Alabama State Route 297
  Arkansas Highway 297
  Florida State Road 297
  Georgia State Route 297
  Iowa Highway 297 (former)
  Kentucky Route 297
  Maryland Route 297
  Minnesota State Highway 297
  Montana Secondary Highway 297
 New York:
  New York State Route 297
  County Route 297 (Erie County, New York)
  North Dakota Highway 297
  Ohio State Route 297
 Ohio State Route 297 (former)
  Pennsylvania Route 297
  Tennessee State Route 297
  Texas State Highway 297 (former)
  Texas State Highway Spur 297
  Farm to Market Road 297
  Urban Road 297 (signed as Farm to Market Road 297)
  Utah State Route 297 (former)